The Huron River is a  waterway in the north central Ohio in the United States. The watershed drains large portions of Erie County and Huron County, the northeast corners of Seneca County and Crawford County, and northern portions of Richland County.

The mouth is on Lake Erie at the city of Huron. The main branch of the river is formed when the East and West branches merge near Milan.

This is within a few miles of the headwaters of both the southwest branch of the Vermilion River (which also flows north to Lake Erie) and Shipp Creek, which is part of the Ohio River watershed via the Black Fork, Mohican, Walhonding, and Muskingum rivers. The West Branch of the Huron flows north and west from Blooming Grove Township through Huron County's Ripley Township, then back into Richland County's Cass Township and into Plymouth. It is here where the river bends north to flow across the Richland/Huron county line into Huron County's New Haven Township and into New Haven. It passes to the east of Willard, although other tributaries rise north of Willard. Still in Huron County, the West Branch continues north through Greenfield Township, Peru Township, and Ridgefield Township. The West Branch continues north into Monroeville and through the balance of Ridgefield Township. Next, the river crosses from Huron County into Erie County and then bends in an easterly direction through southern Oxford Township before reaching the confluence with the East Branch in the Milan State Wildlife Area.

Tributaries

Note: Willard Marsh, within the Willard Marsh State Wildlife Area, feeds into both the West Branch of the Huron River and the Honey Creek tributary of the Sandusky River.  Also, there are numerous creeks, streams, and ditches that are unnamed tributaries in the Huron River basin.

Variant names
According to the Geographic Names Information System, the Huron River has also been known as:
 Hurons River
 Notowacy Thepy [or Naudowessie Sipi ]
 Petquotting [a name adapted from the Moravian village here, 1787–1791.]
 Riviere Huron [or "Riviere aux (Rx) Hurons"]
 Bald Eagle Creek [named for a very large nest of bald-eagles at the river's mouth, in the 1700s]
 Huron Creek

Similarly, the West and East branches have been referred to as the West and East forks.

 Also shown on early maps as named the "Guahadahuri".
 The word "Huron" refers to a Native-American tribe who were also known as the Wyandots (sometimes spelled "Wendots" or "Junundats"). This tribe had many villages in the area of Sandusky Bay, in the latter-1700s.
The Huron River had been given that name by European explorers at least by 1778, when it appears as such on a map by Hutchins. A much earlier map, by Evans in 1755, names it as the "Guahadahuri". (On that Evans map, because of the river's significant depth and navigability even at that early time, it was the only river denoted between Sandusky Bay and the Cuyahoga, but accurately being approx. one-fifth of the distance between the two.) Also in 1755, Pennsylvanian James Smith, who had been captured by Native-Americans and brought to this river to live among them,  recorded the river's name as the "Canesadooharie". Whichever one, or both,  "guahadahuri" or "canesadooharie", was the more phonetically accurate of a Native-American word, but the word's translation seems lost to obscurity.  In 1760, explorer George Croghan refers to the name of this river, also phonetically from its Native-American/Chippewa tribe name, as "Notowacy Thepy"; John Heckewelder recorded it as "Naudowessie Sipi", meaning "the River ("sipi") of the Huron ("Naudowessie") tribe". Some maps of the later-1700s also show the Huron River as "Bald Eagle Creek"; named for a large eagle's nest at its mouth at that time (although one later mapmaker from that time, erroneously denoted "Bald Eagle Creek" and "Guahadahuyi" as being two separate rivers).
 In 1787, the Moravian missionary, David Zeisberger, led a group of Christian-converted Native-Americans from their settlement on the Cuyahoga River, to a new settlement called first Petquotting (but later named 'New Salem' in 1790) on the Huron River, about 3 miles north of (now) Milan, Ohio. They remained until 1791 when forced by local Native-American unrest, they relocated to Canada; but in 1804, some of the Christian-converted Natives, under the direction of G.S. Oppelt, returned to a new different settlement here (also named Petquotting) and it eventually became the village of Milan, Ohio.
 Throughout the latter-1700s, the northern part of the river was a well-known outpost for many French-Canadian  traders, including Gabriel Hunot who ran an Indian-trading-post there in the 1780s, and the later John B. Flammand (or "Flemming") about 1805.  ---
[sources: Indian Captivities (pp. 191–201) by Drake (publ.1852 by Derby and Miller); and Diary(1787-1791) of David Zeisberger, (publ.1885 by Robert Clarke and Co., Cinti.; Heckewelder's History, Manners, and Customs of the Indian Nations; publ.1876; and Diary(1804-1806) of G.S. Oppelt, Moravian Archives, Bethlehem, PA]

Road intersections

West Branch
Here is a detailed account of which roads cross over the West Branch of the Huron River; beginning at the headwaters near Shiloh in Richland County and ending at the confluence with the east branch near Milan in Erie County.

Richland County

Blooming Grove Township
 Noble Road
 Pennel Road
 Baseline Road

Huron County

Ripley Township
 Ashland Railway, formerly CSX Transportation/Baltimore and Ohio
 Edwards Road
 Plymouth East Road
 Old State Road
 New State Road
 Wheeling and Lake Erie Railway, formerly Akron, Canton and Youngstown Railway
 Plymouth East Road
 Townline Road 111
 Baseline Road

Village of Plymouth
 Broadway Street
 North Street
 Plymouth East Road

New Haven Township
 Skinner Road
 
 Klein Road
 Greenbush Road
 Boughtonville Road
 CSX Transportation, formerly Baltimore and Ohio Railroad
 Townline Road 12

Greenfield Township
 Olive Road
 Maple Ridge Road
 
 
 Hanville Corners Road
 Peru Center Road
 Bauman Road

Peru Township
 Troy Mills Road
 Fern Road
 Snyder Road
 Peru West Section Line Road
 Hettle Road
 Terry Road

Ridgefield Township
 Standardsburg Road

Village of Monroeville
 North Coast Inland Trail, formerly New York Central Railroad
 Wheeling and Lake Erie Railway
 
 River Road

Ridgefield Township
 Lamereaux Road

Erie County

Oxford Township
 Huber Road
 Lovers Lane Road
Milan Township
 Confluence with the east branch of the Huron River

East Branch
Here is a detailed account of which roads cross over the East Branch of the Huron River; beginning at the headwaters near Fitchville in Huron County and ending at the confluence with the west branch near Milan in Erie County.

Huron County

Fitchville Township
 Crescent Road
 
 
 Greenwich Milan Townline Road

Fairfield Township
 Edwards Road
 Delta Road
 Fairfield Angling Road
 Old State Road

Village of North Fairfield
 New State Road (Main Street)

Fairfield Township
 
 Hanville Corners Road
 Townline Road 131Bronson Township Ridge Road
 Townline Road 113Peru Township 
 Geiger Road
 Remelle Road
 Johnson RoadRidgefield Township Brown Road
 City of Norwalk Old West Main Street
 
 Wheeling and Lake Erie Railway

 North Coast Inland Trail, formerly New York Central Railroad
 Washington RoadNorwalk Township Lovers Lane Road
 Schaffer Road

Erie CountyMilan Township Confluence with the west branch of the Huron River

Main Stem
Here is a detailed account of which roads cross over the main stem of the Huron River; beginning at the confluence of the East and West branches near Milan in Erie County and ending at Lake Erie near Huron in Erie County.

Erie CountyMilan Township  (concurrent on the same four-lane road)
 (US Geological Survey stream gauge located just downstream of this bridge)
  (concurrent on the same six-lane road)
 Norfolk Southern Railway, formerly Nickel Plate Road
 Old Mason Road (bridge destroyed on 5 July 1969 flood)
 Mason RoadHuron Township City of Huron''
 Norfolk Southern Railway, formerly Conrail/New York Central
 
 Lake Erie

Other information
This is near the intersection of Johnson Road and Peru Center Road.
 An area near the confluence of Seymour Creek and the West Branch (on Lamereaux Road) is said to be haunted.  This area also has history from the War of 1812 era. The Haunting at Blue Bridge

See also
List of rivers of Ohio

References

External links

 National Weather Service—AHPS: Huron River, Ohio

Rivers of Ohio
Tributaries of Lake Erie
Rivers of Erie County, Ohio
Rivers of Huron County, Ohio
Rivers of Richland County, Ohio
Rivers of Crawford County, Ohio
Rivers of Seneca County, Ohio